The Progressive Party, also sometimes known as the Progressists was a group of moderate Russian liberals organized in 1912; it had 25 deputies in the Third Duma and 48 in the Fourth.  Its most prominent members were Ivan Nikolaevich Efremov, Aleksandr Konovalov, and Pavel Ryabushinsky.  In the last two Dumas the Progressists entered into a coalition with the Constitutional Democrats, and in the Fourth Duma they were part of the Progressive Bloc (Russia).  After the February Revolution Efremov and Konovalov became part of the Provisional Government.

References 

Michael T. Florinsky (ed.), McGraw-Hill Encyclopedia of Russia and the Soviet Union (1961), pp. 455-6

External links 
 Большой Российский энциклопедический словарь (Russian)

Political parties established in 1912
Political parties of the Russian Revolution
Political parties in the Russian Empire
Russia
1912 establishments in the Russian Empire
Liberalism in Russia
Political parties disestablished in 1917
1917 disestablishments in Russia